Emile van Heerden (born 8 August 2000) is a South African rugby union player for the  in the Currie Cup and . His regular position is lock.

Van Heerden was named in the  side for the 2021 Currie Cup Premier Division.

References

South African rugby union players
Living people
Rugby union locks
Sharks (Currie Cup) players
2000 births
Sharks (rugby union) players
Rugby union players from Mpumalanga
Lions (United Rugby Championship) players